Terzis is a Greek surname (from , "tailor"). The feminine form is Terzi. It may refer to:

Paschalis Terzis (born 1949), Greek singer
Paul Terzis, Australian rugby coach

See also
Terzi

Greek-language surnames
Surnames